Robert Mason "Bob" Carlisle (born September 29, 1956) is an American Contemporary Christian singer and songwriter. He performed with several bands, most notably Allies and Billy Thermal, before launching a solo career where he received a Grammy Award and four Dove Awards.

Career

Carlisle is best known for his hit song "Butterfly Kisses", which appeared on his third solo album. That album, originally titled Shades of Grace, was later re-released as Butterfly Kisses (Shades of Grace), because of the success of the single. He co-wrote this song with his songwriting partner from Allies, Randy Thomas, and for this, they won the 1997 Grammy Award for Best Country Song and three Dove Awards, including Song of the Year. This song was also a country chart single that same year for Jeff Carson and the Raybon Brothers. After "Butterfly Kisses," Carlisle continued to record for movie soundtracks and with other artists, but could not match the success of his surprise hit.

Discography

With Allies
See: Allies discography

Solo albums

Compilations

Singles

Music videos

Appearances on other albums
1985: Have Yourself Committed Bryan Duncan; background vocals
1985: Manilow Barry Manilow; background vocals
1986: Holy Rollin''' Bryan Duncan; background vocals
1986: One on One Steve Camp; background vocals
1987: Life as We Know It REO Speedwagon; background vocals
1987: Whistlin' In the Dark Bryan Duncan; background vocals
1988: The Reckoning Margaret Becker; background vocals
1989: On the Edge Soundtrack "God's Callin'" and a duet with Benny Hester "Playing Games"
1989: Strong Medicine Bryan Duncan; background vocals, guitar, arrangements
1991: Anonymous Confessions of a Lunatic Friend Bryan Duncan; background vocals
1992: A Friend Like U Geoff Moore & the Distance; background vocals
1992: Change Your World Michael W. Smith; background vocals ("Cross of Gold")
1993: Le Voyage Sandi Patty; background vocals
1993: Soul Margaret Becker
1993: Wake-Up Call Petra
1993: Tapestry Morning ("I Am Not My Own")
1994: Coram Deo II ("Jerusalem")
1994: Find It on the Wings Sandi Patty
1994: Promise Keepers: A Life That Shows1994: Rebecca St. James Rebecca St. James; background vocals
1995: Do You Know This Man? Al Denson; background vocals
1995: Face of Mercy Dallas Holm; background vocals
1995: Field of Souls Wayne Watson; background vocals
1995: Petra Means Rock Petra; background vocals
1995: R.I.O.T. (Righteous Invasion of Truth) Carman
1995: The Lazarus Heart Randy Stonehill
1995: The Music of Christmas Steven Curtis Chapman
1996: Steel Witness The Charlie Daniels Band
1996: Tribute: The Songs of Andrae Crouch1997: Blues Hat Charlie Daniels
1998: Jack Frost [Original Soundtrack] ("Father's Love")
1999: I Surrender All Clay Crosse ("I Will Follow Christ")
1999: Bridges [Original Soundtrack] ("Caravan of Love")
1999: Duets, Vol. 1 Patsy Cline ("That Wonderful Someone")
2000: Brand New Dream Danny Gans ("As Far as You Can See")
2000: Chicken Soup for Little Christian Souls: Songs to Build Your Christian Faith ("Jesus Loves Me")
2000: Left Behind [Original Soundtrack] ("After All (Rayford's Song)")
2000: Millennium Chorus: The Greatest Story Ever Sung ("Treasures in the Darkness")
2000: Child of the Promise ("Nothing Ever Happens to a Shepherd", "Shepherds Recitative")
2002: Left Behind 2: Adult Contemporary ("Rain")
2002: My Everything Helen Baylor ("Harambee")
2003: David: Ordinary Man...Extraordinary God ("Deliver Me (Psalm 59)")
2004: Creation: The Story of Life ("The Eden of My Heart")
2006: Charlotte's Web: Music Inspired by the Motion Picture'' ("Make a Wish")

Awards and nominations

References

External links
 
 

1956 births
American gospel singers
American male singers
American performers of Christian music
Grammy Award winners
Living people
Musicians from Orange County, California
Singers from California
Sparrow Records artists